Andrew Barroway is an American hedge fund manager.  He is the minority owner of the Arizona Coyotes hockey team in the National Hockey League and the majority owner of Greek football club Athens Kallithea FC.

In October 2014, he agreed to purchase the 51% majority share of the Coyotes for $152.5 million, a franchise that was reportedly valued by Coyotes' president Anthony LeBlanc at $305 million. On December 31, 2014, the NHL Board of Governors approved the sale. The team had been previously purchased out of bankruptcy by LeBlanc's group for $170 million in 2013 with substantial concessions by the City of Glendale. The City of Glendale paid subsidies to the NHL when revenue and value failed to meet the required minimums during bankruptcy proceedings. The NHL Board of Governors prevented the city from acquiring an ownership share in the franchise.

In 2015, it was reported that Barroway had missed payments and would be removed from the majority shareholder position. However, in 2016, Barroway reportedly obtained a greater share of the franchise with up to 54% of the shares. In 2017, Barroway then bought out the rest of his IceArizona partners to become the sole shareholder. In 2019, Barroway sold majority interest in the team to Alex Meruelo. 

In August 2021, Barroway purchased the 90% majority share of the Greek football (soccer) club Athens Kallithea FC for 300.000€.

References

American hedge fund managers
Arizona Coyotes owners
National Hockey League owners
People from Phalsbourg
Year of birth missing (living people)
Living people